The Črni Vrh Observatory (IAU code: 106) is an astronomical observatory located in western Slovenia, close to the settlement of Črni Vrh, near the town of Idrija. Much of the construction was done by volunteers.

Regular astronomical observations started in 1975, at a small observatory that was equipped with home-made instruments and was set up 4 km from the present site. At that time, the first images of Comet West were taken. The site is well above the inversion border much of winter, which allows undisturbed observations on many successive clear nights.

The observatory runs a comet and asteroid search program named PIKA after its Slovene acronym. Since March 2003, the program has been operated on a new 60-cm, f/3.3 Cichocki telescope equipped with a Finger Lake 1k × 1k CCD detector. Telescope project funding has been covered in part by the Planetary Society Shoemaker Grant 2000 and 2010. The recent grant was for the purchase of a deep-cooling Apogee Alta U9000 CCD camera that will increase sensitivity of the imaging system, enabling discoveries of even fainter objects. The new camera has been in operation since October 2011.

Members of the Department of Physics, Astronomical Observatory, of the University of Ljubljana, used the site for observations with their  S-C telescope from 1994 to 2009.

On 18 August 2008, the amateur astronomer Stanislav Matičič discovered the comet C/2008 Q1 (Matičič), the first comet discovered in this observatory and in Slovenia. On 16 April 2010, the student Jan Vales discovered the periodic comet designated P/2010 H2 (Vales) in a strong outburst. The Catalina Sky Survey researchers scanned the same region of the sky only 15 hours earlier and missed it.

Telescopes 
 19-cm Automatic Comet Imaging Telescope
 36-cm AIT Imaging System (no longer in use)
 60-cm Cichocki Sky Survey Telescope
 All-Sky Camera
 Most Recent List of Discoveries

Observing team 
 Observers

Discoveries 

The Minor Planet Center credits a large number of minor planet discoveries directly to the observatory (Crni Vrh).

List of discovered minor planets

See also

References

External links 
 official site

Astronomical observatories in Slovenia

Minor-planet discovering observatories